Mella can refer to:

Geography
 Mella (river), an Italian river of Lombardy
 Mella, Cuba, a municipality of Santiago de Cuba Province, Cuba
 Mella, Independencia, a municipality of the Independencia Province, Dominican Republic
 Villa Mella, a municipal district of Santo Domingo Norte, Dominican Republic
 Mella, Nebraska, a community in the United States

Municipalities of Italy
Azzano Mella, in the Province of Brescia, Lombardy
Bagnolo Mella, in the Province of Brescia, Lombardy
Castel Mella, in the Province of Brescia, Lombardy
Pavone del Mella, in the Province of Brescia, Lombardy
Tavernole sul Mella, in the Province of Brescia, Lombardy

People
 Edoardo Arborio Mella (1808–1884), an Italian architect
 Julio Antonio Mella (1903-1929), one of the founders of the "internationalized" Cuban Communist Party
 Juan López Mella (1965-1995), Spanish motorcycle racer
 Keury Mella, baseball player
 Matías Ramón Mella (1816-1864), national hero of the Dominican Republic
 Ricardo Mella (1861-1925), Spanish writer and anarchist
 Urania Mella (1900-1945), Spanish politician, daughter of Ricardo Mella

Other
 Mella (Golgafrinchan), a character from The Hitchhiker's Guide to the Galaxy by Douglas Adams